Khamis Harmal is a sub-district located in Kharif District, 'Amran Governorate, Yemen. Khamis Harmal had a population of 5715  according to the 2004 census.

References 

Sub-districts in Kharif District